Pontefract is a historic market town in the Metropolitan Borough of Wakefield in West Yorkshire, England, east of Wakefield and south of Castleford. Historically part of the West Riding of Yorkshire, it is one of the towns in the City of Wakefield District and had a population of 30,881 at the 2011 Census.

Etymology

At the end of the 11th century, the modern township of Pontefract consisted of two distinct and separate localities known as Tanshelf and Kirkby.  The 11th-century historian Orderic Vitalis recorded that, in 1069, William the Conqueror travelled across Yorkshire to put down an uprising which had sacked York, but that, upon his journey to the city, he discovered that the crossing of the River Aire at what is modern-day Pontefract had been blockaded by a group of local Anglo-Scandinavian insurgents, who had broken the bridge and held the opposite bank in force. Such a crossing point would have been important in the town's early days, providing access between Pontefract and other settlements to the north and east, such as York. Historians believe that it is this historical event which gives the township of Pontefract its modern name. The name "Pontefract" originates from the Latin for "broken bridge", formed of the elements pons (bridge) and fractus (broken). Pontefract was not recorded in the 1086 Domesday Book, but it was noted as Pontefracto in 1090, four years after the Domesday survey.

History

Neolithic
In 2007 a suspected extension of Ferrybridge Henge – a Neolithic henge – was discovered near Pontefract during a survey in preparation for the construction of a row of houses. Once the survey was complete, the construction continued.

Roman
The modern town is situated on an old Roman road (now the A639), described as the "Roman Ridge". This is believed to form part of an alternative route from Doncaster to York via Castleford and Tadcaster, as a diversion of the major Roman road Ermine Street, which may have been used to avoid having to cross the River Humber near North Ferriby during rough weather conditions over the Humber.

Anglo-Scandinavian history
The period of Yorkshire's history between the demise of the Viking king Eric Bloodaxe in 954 and the arrival of the Normans in 1068 is known as the Anglo-Scandinavian age.  The modern township of Pontefract consisted of two Anglo-Scandinavian settlements, known as Tanshelf and Kirkby.  In Yorkshire, place-name locations often contain the distinctive Danish '-by' i.e. Kirkby.  And even today, the major streets in Pontefract are designated by the Danish word 'gate' e.g. Bailygate.

Tanshelf and Kirkby
The Anglo-Scandinavian township of Tanshelf recorded variously as Tateshale, Tateshalla, Tateshalle or Tatessella in the Domesday Book of 1086 existed in the region that is today occupied by the town of Pontefract.  The Anglo-Saxon Chronicle makes its first reference to Tanshelf in the year 947 when King Eadred of England met with the ruling council of Northumbria to accept its submission. King Eadred did not enjoy Northumbria's support for long, and a year later the kingdom voted Eric Bloodaxe King of York.

When the Domesday Book was commissioned by William the Conqueror in 1086, Tanshelf was still a sizeable settlement for the period. The town had a priest, 60 petty burgesses, 16 cottagers, 16 villagers and 8 smallholders, amounting to a total of 101 people.  But the actual size of the population might be as much as four or five times larger than this as the people listed are landholders, and therefore the Domesday Book does not take their families into account.  Tanshelf also had a church, a fishery and three mills.  Archaeologists have discovered the remains of the church on The Booths in Pontefract, off North Baileygate, below the castle. The oldest grave dates from around 690. The church is likely to be at Tanshelf and may have been similar to the church at Ledsham.  The area which is now the town market place was the original meeting place of the Osgoldcross wapentake.
In the Anglo-Saxon period a part of the modern township of Pontefract was known by the Anglo-Scandinavian name of Kirkby.

Medieval

Norman conquest

After the Norman conquest in 1066 almost all of Yorkshire came under the ownership of followers of William the Conqueror, one of whom was Ilbert de Lacy who became the owner of Tateshale (Tanshelf) where he began to build a castle.
Pontefract Castle began as a wooden motte and bailey castle, built before 1086 and later rebuilt in stone. The de Lacys lived in the castle for more than two centuries and were holders of the castle and the Honour of Pontefract from 1067 until the death of Alice de Lacy in 1348.

King Richard II was murdered at the castle in 1400. Little is known of the precise nature of his demise; in particular Shakespeare may have "adjusted" the facts for his own purposes. There are at least three theories which attempt to explain his death: either he was starved to death by his keepers, he starved himself to death or he was murdered by Sir Piers (Peter) Exton on 14 February 1399 or 1400.

Robin Hood and the outlaw's Pontefract connection
The town of Pontefract and the village of Wentbridge are of central importance to the legend of Robin Hood, as it was told in the Middle Ages. The Fifteenth century Robin Hood ballads place the outlaw's activities in the forest of Barnsdale, the southern edge of which bordered modern Wakefield. The earliest surviving manuscript of a Robin Hood ballad, "Robin Hood and the Potter" makes reference to Wentbridge: "'Y mete hem bot at Went breg,' s(e)yde Lytyll John" ('I met him but at Wentbridge', said Little John). Likewise, the Fifteenth Century ballad "A Gest of Robyn Hode", appears to make a cryptic reference to the village by depicting a friendly knight explaining to Robin that he 'went at a brydge' where there was 'a wraste-lyng' (wrestling). Significantly, the Gest of Robyn Hode makes a very specific reference to a location within Wentbridge known as 'the Saylis' and 'the Sayles', as in a four line stanza the outlaw chief instructs his Merry Men to

Walk up to the Saylis
And so to Watling Street
And wait after some uncouth guest
Upon Chance you may them meet

The 19th-century antiquarian Joseph Hunter identified the site of the Saylis: a small tenancy, of one-tenth of a knight's fee (i.e. a knight's annual income), located on high ground 500 yards (457.2 metres) to the east of the village of Wentbridge in the manor of Pontefract. The Saylis is recorded as having contributed towards the aid that was granted to King Edward III in 1346–47 for the knighting of his son, the Black Prince.  The late, great historians Richard Barrie Dobson and John Taylor indicated that this location provides a very specific clue to Robin Hood's Pontefract heritage, noting that such evidence of continuity makes it virtually certain that the Saylis or Sayles, which was so well known to the Robin Hood of the "Gest" survived into modern times as the 'Sayles Plantation' near Wentbridge. To commemorate this, English Heritage has sited a Blue Plaque on the bridge that stands in the heart of the village, above the River Went, lending weight to Pontefract's claims to be the true home of Robin Hood.

Wentbridge is a small village in the City of Wakefield district of West Yorkshire, England. It lies around 3 miles (5 km) southeast of its nearest town of size, Pontefract, close to the A1 road. During the Middle Ages the village of Wentbridge was itself sometimes referred to by the name of Barnsdale because it was the main settlement in the Forest of Barnsdale.  The county boundary follows the A1 from the River Went to Barnsdale Bar, which is the southernmost point of North Yorkshire. Close by to the southwest is the Roman Ridge, a Roman road, known in the Middle Ages as Watling Street, closely follows the course of the modern-day A639. It was at one time, prior to modern construction works being completed, possible to look down from the Saylis upon Watling Street as it snaked through the village of Wentbridge and it is upon this stretch of highway that Robin Hood and his Merry Men are believed to have committed their famous heists. Earlier historians have usually assumed that this district was heavily wooded. However, aerial photography and excavation have shown that the region has always been a largely pastoral landscape dotted with occasional settlements. In close proximity to the village of Wentbridge there are, or were, some notable landmarks which relate to Robin Hood. The earliest-known Robin Hood place-name reference – in Yorkshire or anywhere else – occurs in a deed of 1322 from the two cartularies of Monk Bretton Priory, near the town of Barnsley. The cartulary deed refers in Latin to a landmark named 'the Stone of Robert Hode' (Robin Hood's Stone), which was located in the Barnsdale area. According to J. W. Walker this was on the eastern side of the Great North Road, a mile south of Barnsdale Bar. On the opposite side of the road once stood Robin Hood's Well, which has since been relocated six miles north-west of Doncaster, on the south-bound side of the Great North Road.

Further evidence of Robin Hood's Wakefield connections comes by way of Michael Drayton's Poly-Olbion Song 28 (67–70), composed in 1622.  The poem strengthens Robin Hood's connections to Pontefract because it speaks of the outlaw's death and clearly states that the outlaw died at 'Kirkby'.  Kirkby was an Anglo-Saxon settlement upon which the modern town Pontefract stands.  In 2014, the historian Dr S. A. La' Chance published a thesis that detailed how a notorious medieval outlaw named Swein-Son-Of-Sicga, and styled by contemporaries as 'The Prince of Thieves' inhabited the forested areas of Barnsdale, on the outskirts of Pontefract, and made a living by robbing, amongst others Abbot Benedict of Selby. Professor J. Green indicates that Hugh Fitz Baldric, the late eleventh century Sheriff of Nottingham and Yorkshire, held responsibility for bringing Swein-Son-Of-Sicga to justice.  Acknowledging this, La' Chance suggested that the Robin Hood legend is loosely based upon the deeds of Swein-Son-Of-Sicga.  La' Chance closed his thesis by suggesting that, in all likelihood, the outlaw drew his final breath at Saint Nicholas's hospital, Kirkby (modern day Pontefract), which would account for the reference to Robin Hood's death in the Poly-Olbion.

Early modern history

Tudor
In Elizabethan times the castle, and Pontefract itself, was referred to as "Pomfret". William Shakespeare's play Richard III mentions the castle:

Pomfret, Pomfret! O thou bloody prison,
Fatal and ominous to noble peers!
Within the guilty closure of thy walls
Richard the second here was hack'd to death;
And, for more slander to thy dismal seat,
We give thee up our guiltless blood to drink.

Stuart history

Civil war

Pontefract suffered throughout the English Civil War. In 1648–49 the castle was laid under siege by Oliver Cromwell, who said it was "... one of the strongest inland garrisons in the kingdom." Three sieges by the Parliamentarians left the town "impoverished and depopulated". In March 1649, after the third siege, Pontefract inhabitants, fearing a fourth, petitioned Parliament for the castle to be slighted. In their view, the castle was a magnet for trouble, and in April 1649 demolition began.  The ruins of the castle remain and are publicly accessible.

Pontefract Priory history
Pontefract was the site of Pontefract Priory, a Cluniac priory founded in 1090 by Robert de Lacy dedicated to St John the Evangelist. The priory was dissolved by royal authority in 1539. The abbey maintained the Chartularies of St John, a collection of historic documents later discovered among family papers by Thomas Levett, the High Sheriff of Rutland and a native of Yorkshire, who later gave them to Roger Dodsworth, an antiquary. They were later published by the Yorkshire Archaeological Society.

Economy

Pontefract has been a market town since the Middle Ages; market days are Wednesday and Saturday, with a small market on Fridays. The covered market is open all week except Sundays. The town is called Ponte or Ponty by its citizens and sometimes jokingly referred to as Ponte Carlo, with reference to Monte Carlo. This theme is continued in the name of bars in the Xscape complex located in Glasshoughton between Pontefract and Castleford, referred to locally as Cas Vegas. Numerous pubs can be found in the town centre in particular; for example: Beastfair Vaults, the Liquorice Bush, the Red Lion, the Malt Shovel and the Ponty Tavern.  A Wetherspoons public house opened on Horsefair in 2010. It is said by some that Pontefract once held a record for being the town with the highest number of pubs per square mile in the UK, but this is likely an urban legend, and the title is currently held by another town.

The town has a liquorice-sweet industry; and the famous Pontefract cakes are produced, though the liquorice plant itself is no longer grown there. The town's two liquorice factories are owned by Haribo and Valeo Confectionery (formerly Tangerine).  A Liquorice festival is held annually. Poet laureate Sir John Betjeman wrote a poem entitled "The Licorice Fields at Pontefract". In 2012, local farmer Robert Copley announced that he would be re-introducing a liquorice crop to Pontefract.

Close by is the site of the former coal-fired Ferrybridge power station, although the local coal mines largely closed in the 1990s, which contributed to high unemployment in the local area. The final colliery, Prince of Wales Colliery, closed in August 2002. has since been redeveloped into a large housing estate named after the colliery.

There are  4 supermarkets in Pontefract, including a Tesco and Morrisons that are located opposite each other and an Asda, which was originally a Kwik Save store, and Aldi both a short distance outside the town centre. The secondary schools in the town are Carleton High School in Carleton and the King's School on Mill Hill Lane, both for pupils aged 11–16. A sixth-form college, New College, Pontefract, is located on Park Lane.

The old Pontefract General Infirmary on Southgate (pictured) was a general hospital; it is the place at which serial killer Harold Shipman began to murder his elderly patients. Beneath this building is an old hermitage, open to the public on certain days. Pontefract Museum, from which the hermitage schedule can be obtained, is in the town centre, housed in the former Carnegie library.

A new hospital was built on Friarwood Lane and opened in July 2010, with the new name of Pontefract Hospital; there is now a modern hospital building. Near to the hospital is Friarwood Valley Gardens, a rose garden, a sensory garden, a pinhole camera (formerly an aviary and earlier a Georgian gambling den) and an avenue of cherry trees.

The local police force is West Yorkshire Police, with the town's neighbourhood policing team being situated at the new fire station on Stumpcross Lane. The original police station, situated in Sessions House yard, has now closed and been demolished, since the new divisional headquarters for the Wakefield District opened in Normanton and the neighbouring magistrates' court has moved over to Leeds, following the closure of the Wakefield and Pontefract courts.

Fire cover is provided by West Yorkshire Fire and Rescue Service, with one pump (sometimes two) based at Pontefract Fire Station. Formerly located on Stuart Road in the town centre, the station has now moved to a new site at Stumpcross Lane, by the A645 at the town's eastern edge. The new fire station also provides cover for Knottingley; that town's fire station having been closed as part of the merging of fire cover for Pontefract and Knottingley.

Ambulance cover is provided by Yorkshire Ambulance service, whose depot is situated in neighbouring town, Castleford

The Territorial Army, Army Cadets and Air Training Corps all have a presence within the town and are based at the historic Barracks building on Wakefield Road. It now houses a Rifles Regiment Recruitment team.

A house on Chequerfield Estate is said to be haunted by a poltergeist, nicknamed The Black Monk of Pontefract.

Media, arts and entertainment
The local newspaper is the Pontefract and Castleford Express. Drinking venues include The Red Lion, the Green Dragon, the Tap and Barrel, The Broken Bridge (Wetherspoons), the Malt Shovel, and the Ponty Tavern (formally The Blackmoor Head) or Blacky in local terms. In August 2012, one of Pontefract's oldest but most prestige nightclubs, Kiko's, re-opened its doors to the public after being closed since 2007, then closed again in 2013 due to the building being too far away from the town and other nightlife spots. Kiko's once hosted many notable performances back in the 1970s and 80s from notable bands such as The Bay City Rollers. As of 2022, the building is now vacant and severely damaged inside awaiting revival, venue change or demolition.

Novelist Jack Vance, in the "Demon Princes" cycle has named the capital of Aloysius, the main planet in the Vega system, after Pontefract. The hero of the series, Kirth Gersen, has his residence there.

Pontefract made local and national newspapers in April 2020, with a range of art which lay tribute to the key workers and NHS during the coronavirus outbreak. The art was painted by a local mural artist, Rachel List.

Governance
For local government purposes the town lies in the City of Wakefield, coming under the governance of Wakefield Council. For this purpose it is divided into two electoral wards, Pontefract North and Pontefract South. Pontefract South is currently represented by two Labour councillors and one Conservative councillor with North ward represented by three Labour councillors [as of August 2022]. South ward is a marginal ward, containing relatively affluent suburbs of Pontefract and outlying villages such as Darrington, combined with less wealthy areas such as Chequerfield, whilst North Ward includes parts of Monkhill and Nevison.

From 1978 to 1997 the local ex-miner and former local NUM branch leader Geoff Lofthouse (18 December 1925 – 1 November 2012) was MP for the former constituency of Pontefract and Castleford. During this time he rose to the position of Deputy Speaker of the House of Commons. When the general election of 1997 was called he stood down to allow Yvette Cooper to be selected as the Labour Party candidate for that election. He was made a peer on 11 June 1997.

Yvette Cooper was elected as the Member of Parliament (MP) for the Pontefract and Castleford constituency at the 1997 general election. Cooper held a number of positions in the Labour governments up to 2010, followed by Shadow Cabinet roles (most notably Shadow Home Secretary) after the election of that year, but returned to the back benches following the Labour leadership election of 2015. Pontefract and Castleford was merged with the Normanton constituency in a boundary change before the 2010 general election.

In her maiden speech to the House of Commons, Cooper said:"It is true that my constituency is plagued by unemployment, but I represent hard-working people who are proud of their strong communities and who have fought hard across generations to defend them. They are proud of their socialist traditions, and have fought for a better future for their children and their grandchildren. In the Middle Ages, that early egalitarian, the real Robin Hood, lived, so we maintain, in the Vale of Wentbridge to the south of Pontefract. It was a great base from which to hassle the travelling fat cats on the Great North Road."

The seat, which has a history of mining and industry, has consistently returned Labour MPs at general elections. Yvette Cooper polled 59.5% of the vote in the 2017 general election.  Support appears to have fallen with the majority falling to 48.1% of the vote in the 2019 general election.

Sport
The town is home to many sports including rugby, football and squash. Prominent squash players Lee Beachill and James Willstrop both train at Pontefract Squash Club. Notable institutions are horse racing at Pontefract Racecourse and Featherstone Rovers, the area's professional rugby league club.

It stages flat racing between the end of March and the end of October. A new sports centre is located at Pontefract Park which opened on 12 April 2021, which replaces the old swimming pool located on Stuart Road. Two-time European Masters Champion weightlifter Martyn Riley is based in Pontefract.

Pontefract has its own non-league football club, Pontefract Collieries F.C., which was founded in 1958 and plays adjacent to the former Prince of Wales Colliery off Beechnut Lane. The team, known locally as "Ponte Colls" play in the Northern Premier League Division One North West (correct as of the 2021–22 season). Pontefract is also home to the Pontefract Knights rugby league football club.

Pontefract RUFC is based at Moor Lane, Carleton.  It runs three senior sides as well as a number of junior and girls teams. Rugby Union has been played in the town since the 19th century when Pontefract won the Yorkshire Cup.

Pontefract used to boast two cricket clubs, Lakeside CC (based in Pontefract Park) and Pontefract CC (adjacent to Pontefract Collieries FC), but by 2002 neither of these clubs were still in existence, leaving the town without its own club despite giving its name to the Pontefract and District Cricket League. Nowadays cricketers must travel to clubs in neighbouring towns and villages, with the closest being Hundhill Hall Cricket Club based in the nearby village East Hardwick.

Transport

Railway

Buses

Bus transport is provided by Arriva Yorkshire, operating from Pontefract bus station as the town's main hub.

Roads
Pontefract lies in close proximity to the A1 and the M62. Access from the A1 is via a junction at the nearby village of Darrington, while access from the M62 is via Junction 32 (also for Castleford) and Junction 33 (also for Knottingley).

Air
The closest airports are Leeds Bradford and Doncaster Sheffield.

Notable people

 Darren Appleton (1976–) Professional pool player, 9 ball world champion, 10 ball world champion.
 Thurstan of Bayeux, (c.1071–1140), archbishop, died in Pontefract.
 Richard de Pontefract (?–1320?), Dominican friar
 John Ramsden (1594–1646), High Sheriff of Yorkshire, MP for Pontefract in the Short Parliament, and Royalist soldier
 John Jackson (1595?–1637), MP for Pontefract during the Happy Parliament
 Francis Drake (1696–1771), antiquary and surgeon
 Robert Monckton, (1726–1782), MP for Pontefract and British army general
 John Smyth (1748–1811), MP for Pontefract
 Jesse Hartley (1780–1860), civil engineer and Superintendent of the Concerns of the Dock Estate, Liverpool; built the Albert Dock and many other parts of Liverpool Docks
 Charles Coleman (1807–1874), English painter
 Isaac Cole (1886–1940), rugby union and league player who represented England
 Edward Upward (1903–2009), novelist, lived in Pontefract from 2004 until his death in 2009
 Barbara Castle (1910–2002), Labour Party politician
 John Poulson (1910–1993), architectural designer and businessman
 Don Robinson (1932–2017), 1954 Rugby League World Cup winning rugby league footballer who represented Great Britain, Wakefield Trinity, Leeds, and Doncaster
 Mal Kirk (1936–1987), wrestler
 Margaret Drabble (1939–), novelist, was evacuated to Pontefract during WW2
 Harvey Proctor (1947–), Conservative Member of Parliament
 Mick Jackson (1947–), musician, writer of "Blame It on the Boogie"
 Kevin Moreton (1959–), actor known for Coronation Street
 Jane Collins (1962–), politician, UKIP, Brexit Party MEP Yorkshire (2014–2019)
 Paul Crichton (1968–), former footballer who currently serves as goalkeeping coach for Huddersfield Town
 Helen Baxendale (1970–), actress known for Cold Feet, Friends and Cuckoo
 Paul Newlove (1971–), English rugby league footballer who played in the 1980s, 1990s and 2000s
 Dave Smith (1971–), professional darts player from Knottingley, Wakefield, West Yorkshire
 Robert Hanby (1974–), former footballer
 Dexter Tucker (1975–), footballer
 Chris Silverwood (1975–), cricketer who represented Yorkshire, Middlesex and England. Former coach of the England Men's Cricket team
 Jamie Davis (1981–), actor, best known for his roles in Footballers' Wives, Hex and currently in Casualty as Max Walker
 Rob Burrow (1982–), former rugby league footballer with Leeds; he also has represented both England and Great Britain
 Toby Kebbell (1982–) actor known for "Black Mirror", "RocknRolla", "Dawn of the Planet of the Apes", "Warcraft", "Kong: Skull Island"
 Jamie McCombe, (1983–), footballer who currently plays for Doncaster Rovers
 Paul Green (1983–), footballer who plays for Oldham in the English Football League
 Tim Bresnan (1985–), cricketer who represented Yorkshire, Warwickshire and England
 Ben Parker (1987–), former footballer who played for Leeds United and represented England U19
 Oliver Hindle (1988–), artist and musician, best known for his band project Superpowerless
 Max Litchfield (1995–), swimmer, silver medallist in the 400m medley at the European Long Course Championships
 Joe Westerman, rugby league footballer
James Willstrop (1983–) squash player and gentleman. Attended Ackworth School and in 2012 became World No.1 in squash by beating David Palmer.
Dr Harold Shipman spent some time working here.

See also
 Listed buildings in Pontefract
 Ackworth, West Yorkshire
 Pontefract Hermitage

Notes

Sources
Ayto, John and Crofton, Ian, Brewer's Britain & Ireland, Weidenfeld & Nicolson.
Fletcher, J. S. (1917), Memorials of a Yorkshire Parish (facsimile), Old Hall Press, Leeds 1993
Hey, David, Medieval South Yorkshire
Holmes, Richard (editor) (1887), The Sieges of Pontefract Castle (facsimile reprint), Old Hall Press, Leeds 1985 
Mills A. D., Oxford Dictionary of British Place-Names, Oxford University Press.
Padgett, Lorenzo (1905), Chronicles of Old Pontefract (facsimile), Old Hall Press, Leeds 1993
Pontefract's Martyn Riley celebrates second European Masters title

External links

 Local history

 
Towns in West Yorkshire
Market towns in West Yorkshire
Unparished areas in West Yorkshire
Geography of the City of Wakefield